The Pârâul Mic (in its upper course also: Pietrosu) is a right tributary of the river Ghimbășel in Romania. It flows into the Ghimbășel south of Râșnov.

References

Rivers of Romania
Rivers of Brașov County